Amawan is a village and corresponding community development block in Rae Bareli district, Uttar Pradesh, India. It historically was the seat of a taluqdari estate held by a Pathan family and eventually split into two shares. As of 2011, its population is 5,245, in 973 households. It has 5 primary schools and no healthcare facilities.

History 
The taluqdars of Amawan claimed descent from Bhikham Khan, a Niyazi Pathan general in the army of Shihab-ud-Din Ghori who obtained a grant of land in the pargana of Salon along with the hereditary title of Diwan. His descendant Ibrahim Khan later gained control of Amawan. Much later, the brothers Qadirdad Khan and Sher Zaman Khan divided their territories into two adjoining estates: Qadirdad Khan received the Pahremau estate, and Sher Zaman Khan received the Amawan estate. Sher Zaman Khan's son and successor, Allahdad Khan, had his property seized by one Rana Beni Madho Bakhsh, but he was able to recover it with the aid of the chakladar. He then was faced with the Kanhpurias seizing part of his lands, and he later made a settlement with Raja Jagpal Singh of Tiloi. Since Allahdad Khan had no sons, the sanad for the Amawan estate went to the husbands of his two daughters after he died. The Amawan estate was then split into two shares, but both shareholders fell heavily into debt and had to sell off or mortgage their lands by the turn of the 20th century.

The 1961 census recorded Amawan as comprising 22 hamlets, with a total population of 1,881 people (942 male and 939 female), in 399 households and 301 physical houses. The area of the village was given as 1,477 acres.

The 1981 census recorded Amawan as having a population of 2,647 people, in 574 households, and having an area of 590.46 hectares. The main staple foods were given as wheat and rice.

Villages
Amawan CD block has the following 87 villages:

References

Villages in Raebareli district
Community development blocks in India
Former zamindari estates in Uttar Pradesh